Ctenuchidia virgo is a moth of the subfamily Arctiinae first described by Gottlieb August Wilhelm Herrich-Schäffer in 1855. It is found on Jamaica, Cuba and Puerto Rico.

References

Moths described in 1855
Arctiinae